Grand National is a 1985 video game for the ZX Spectrum from British publisher Elite Systems. It is based on the horse race of the same name. The goal is to win a race with your chosen horse at Aintree Racecourse while also having a bet on the outcome. An Amiga port was published in 1989.

Gameplay

Rapidly alternating between two keys makes the horse run. Another key jumps over fences.

See also
Olympic Decathlon, 1980 game with similar controls

References

External links

Grand National at Lemon Amiga

1985 video games
Amiga games
Horse racing video games
Sports video games
Video games developed in the United Kingdom
ZX Spectrum games